This is a list of cities in Malta. By the usual standards that most other countries use when designating a city, Malta's cities would be too small to be considered such, and in fact Malta is sometimes regarded as a single city-state. Malta's cities are regarded as such because they received the designation of "città" at some point during their history. In Maltese law, no distinction is made between cities, towns, and villages; and city status is purely honorary and colloquial. Malta is divided into 68 local councils. The local councils which formerly had city status all feature a mural crown on the crest of their coat of arms. The table shows historical cities:

See also
Local councils of Malta
List of mayors of Malta
List of localities in Malta
Local councils of Malta

References 

Malta, List of cities in
 
Cities